ICSS may refer to:
Institute for Cognitive Science Studies
Intracranial Self-Stimulation
Integrated Control and Safety Systems
Interdisciplinary Social Science Research Center, Zhejiang University
International Centre for Sport Security
International Climate Space Station